John Brownlee Robertson (September 14, 1809 – July 14, 1892) was an American politician.

Robertson was born in Charleston, S. C., on September 14, 1809.  He graduated from Yale College in 1829.  After graduation, he began the study of medicine with his brother-in-law, Dr. S. H. Dickson, and received the degree of M.D. from the Charleston Medical College in 1832.  He had already married in New Haven, in 1830, Mary W., daughter of Abel Denison, and he settled here in business but did not practice his profession. His wife died on February 1, 1835, and in 1838 he married Mabel Maria Heaton, daughter of Abiam Heaton, of New Haven. In 1837-8 he was a member of the Common Council, and in 1840 he was sent to the Connecticut General Assembly, but declined a re-nomination in 1842. In 1846 he was a member of the Connecticut Senate, and for the two succeeding years he was Secretary of State of Connecticut. He was then made postmaster of New Haven and served until 1853. Until about this date he was engaged in the business of carpet-manufacture.  He was also, until his retirement in 1870, secretary of the American Mutual Life Insurance Company. In 1867-8 he served as alderman of the city, and in 1881 and 1882 as Mayor of New Haven.  At the time of his death, as for many years previous, he was junior warden of Trinity Church.  He died of old age at his residence in New Haven on July 14, 1892, in his 83d year. His wife survived him with five of their six children—three daughters and two sons—the elder son being a graduate of Yale College in the class of 1872. Two children by his former marriage died before him.

External links

1809 births
1892 deaths
Politicians from Charleston, South Carolina
Yale College alumni
Medical University of South Carolina alumni
Members of the Connecticut House of Representatives
Connecticut state senators
Secretaries of the State of Connecticut
Mayors of New Haven, Connecticut
19th-century American politicians